Ivan Petrovich Ivanov-Vano (– 25 March 1987), born Ivanov, was a Soviet and Russian animation director, animator, screenwriter, educator, professor at Gerasimov Institute of Cinematography (VGIK). One of the pioneers of the Soviet animation school, he is sometimes called the "Patriarch of Soviet animation". People's Artist of the USSR (1985).

Biography
Ivan Petrovich Ivanov was born in the Manezhnaya Square district, at the time populated by students and poor people. His parents had a peasant background. His father was a shoemaker who arrived to Moscow from the Kaluga Governorate; soon he left the family. Ivanov's mother was illiterate and couldn't give her son a proper education, thus he was raised in the family of his elder sister Evdokia Petrovna Spasskaya who was married to an artist and educator at the Moscow School of Painting, Sculpture and Architecture. As a result, Ivanov became interested in art early in his life and as a kid drew decorations for a puppet theater.

At the age of 14, Ivanov also entered the Moscow School of Painting. After the October Revolution it was reformed and turned into Vkhutemas (Higher Art and Technical Studios). He continued his studies and finally graduated from Vkhutemas in 1923. In a year, Ivanov started working as an animator at the State Film Technicum. Together with his fellow students he created some of the first Soviet animated films using home-made tools. Their works were distinguished by cutout animation and unique art style influenced by constructivism.

In 1927, Ivanov turned to traditional animation with one of the boldest experiments The Skating Rink directed by Yuri Zhelyabuzhsky. In later years he took part in a number of other important projects. Around the same time he started using Ivanov-Vano as a pseudonym. According to some of his colleagues, this was done in order to distinguish himself from another prominent Soviet animator Aleksandr Ivanov.

In 1936, Ivanov started working as a director at the newly founded Soyuzmultfilm. His earlier works at the studio were heavily influenced by early Disney — a popular trend during the middle 1930s which he later opposed. In 1939, Ivanov directed Moydodyr based on the fairy tale of the same name which became a big step from the Disney stylistics towards more traditional Russian art that predominated during later years.

In 1939, Ivanov organized animation courses at VGIK where he also became one of the leading educators (he was granted the title of professor in 1952). Among his student were Lev Milchin, Yevgeniy Migunov, Aleksandr Petrov, Francheska Yarbusova, Stanislav Sokolov and a Bulgarian animator Todor Dinov. Ivanov was a member of the Communist Party from 1951, and was also a founder and the original Vice President of ASIFA (International Animated Film Association) from 1961 to 1973.

Ivanov-Vano directed a record number of Soviet feature animated films, often working as a screenwriter as well. The majority of his works were based on Russian folklore and fairy tales by classical Russian writers. In 1947, shortly after the end of war, Ivanov presented the first Soviet feature-length animated film The Humpbacked Horse based on the fairy tale in verse by Pyotr Pavlovich Yershov. The film gained a lot of praise internationally, and Walt Disney even used it as a teaching tool for his studios.

Since 1962 his artistic style varied a lot. He approached lubok, icon painting, frescoes, Dymkovo toys, lace and Russian avant-garde. Some of his longtime collaborators such as Alexandra Snezhko-Blotskaya and Yuri Norstein who started as his second unit directors and co-directors went on to become popular directors on their own. Ivanov-Vano was a laureate of numerous festivals. His short film The Battle of Kerzhenets won Grand Prix award at Animafest Zagreb in 1972.

Ivanov died on March 25, 1987 and was buried at the Novodevichy Cemetery. For 54 years, he was married to Tatiana Ivanova-Bekker (1902—1982). They had a daughter Galina.

Films

 China in Flames (1925) – one of the first Soviet animated films.  He participated as an artist.
 Ice Rink (1927)
 Sen'ka the African (1927)
 The Adventures of Munchhausen (1928)
 Black and White (1932) – with L.A. Amalriko
 The Tale of the Czar Durondai (1934) – with V.C. and Z.C. Brumberg
 The Dragonfly and the Ant (1935) – with V.C. and Z.C. Brumberg
 Kotofey Kotofeyich (1937)
 Journal of Political Satire 1 (1938)
 Little Liar (Girl) (1938)
 The Three Musketeers (1938)
 Moidodyr (1939 and 1954)
 Ivas' (1940)
 Journal of Political Satire 2 (1944) – with V.C. and Z.C. Brumberg, O.P. Hodataev and A.V. Ivanov
 Stolen Sun (1944)
 Winter Tale (1945)
 The Humpbacked Horse (1947) – remade in 1976
 Geese-Swans (1949) – with A.G. Snezhko-Blotska
 Another's Voice (1949)
 The Story of the Dead Princess and a Brave Family (1951) – based on Pushkin's fairy tale
 The Snow Maiden (1952)
 Forest Concert (1953)
 The Brave Hare (1955)
 The Twelve Months (1956)
 Song about Friendship (1957)
 Once Upon a Time... (1957)
 The Adventures of Buratino (1959) – based on Buratino, a collaboration with Dmitri Babichenko
 The Flying Proletariat (1962) – with I. Boyarskii
 Lefty (1964) – also called The Mechanical Flea
 How One Man Fed Two Generals (1965) – with V. Danilevich
 Go There, Don't Know Where (1966) – with V. Danilevich
 Legend About a Malicious Giant (1968)
 The Seasons of the Year (1969) – based on Tchaikovsky's The Seasons (Troika and Fall)
 The Battle of Kerzhenets (1970) – a collaboration with Yuri Norstein
 Ave Maria (1972)
 The Humpbacked Horse (1976) – remake of 1947 film
 The Magic Lake (1979) – stereographic animation
 The Tale of Tsar Saltan (1984) – based on a poem by Pushkin

See also
 History of Russian animation
 List of animated feature films
 Lev Atamanov

References

Sources
 Giannalberto Bendazzi – Cartoons: One Hundred Years of Animation, 1995
 Full filmography at the Animator.ru
 Filmography at Animatsiya.net, where most of his films can be watched with English subtitles
 New York Times Biography

1900 births
1987 deaths
Communist Party of the Soviet Union members
Academic staff of the Gerasimov Institute of Cinematography
Films directed by Ivan Ivanov-Vano
People's Artists of the RSFSR
People's Artists of the USSR
Recipients of the Order of Lenin
Recipients of the Order of the Red Banner of Labour
Recipients of the Vasilyev Brothers State Prize of the RSFSR
Russian animated film directors
Russian animators
Soviet animation directors
Soviet animators
Vkhutemas alumni
Burials at Novodevichy Cemetery
Moscow School of Painting, Sculpture and Architecture alumni